Bruce Clark (or Clarke) may refer to:
Bruce Allan Clark (born 1944), activist for Native American rights
Bruce Clark (gridiron football) (born 1957), American NFL football player who played for the New Orleans Saints and Kansas City Chiefs
Bruce Clark (journalist), international security editor of The Economist
Bruce Clark (bishop) (born 1939), Anglican bishop of Riverina, Australia
Bruce Clark (rugby league) (born 1958), Australian rugby league player
Bruce Clarke (musician) (1925–2008), Australian jazz musician
Bruce Clarke (soccer) (1910–?), South African footballer
Bruce C. Clarke (1901–1988), commander of the Continental Army Command
Bruce B. G. Clarke (born 1943), retired US Army officer, author and consultant